The Cost is a 1920 American silent drama film directed by Harley Knoles and written by Clara Beranger and David Graham Phillips. The film stars Violet Heming, Edwin Mordant, Jane Jennings, Ralph Kellard, Edward Arnold, and Clifford Grey.  The movie was based on a 1904-novel by David Graham Phillips.

Cast
Violet Heming as Pauline Gardner
Edwin Mordant as Colonel Gardner
Jane Jennings as Mrs. Gardner
Ralph Kellard as John Dumont
Edward Arnold as Hampden Scarborough 
Clifford Grey as William Fanshaw Jr. 
Carlotta Monterey as Leonora Fanshaw
Aileen Pringle as Olivia 
Warburton Gamble as Mowbray Langdon
Florence McGuire as Suzanne
Julia Hurley as Grandma

Preservation status
Currently, this film is lost.

References

External links 

 
 

1920 films
1920s English-language films
Silent American drama films
1920 drama films
Paramount Pictures films
Films directed by Harley Knoles
American black-and-white films
American silent feature films
1920s American films
Lost American films

Films based on American novels